NSZ can refer to:

Nanking Safety Zone, a demilitarized area in Nanking, China in 1937-1938
Narodowe Siły Zbrojne (National Armed Forces), World War II resistance movement in Poland